
This is a list of aircraft in alphabetical order beginning with 'B' as far as 'Be'.

B–Be

B&F

(B&F Technik Vertriebs gmbh, Germany)
 B&F Fk9
 B&F Fk12
 B&F Fk14 Polaris
 B&F Fk131 Bücker Jungmann
 FK-Lightplanes SW51 Mustang

BA

see: British Aircraft Manufacturing

Baade 

(Dr. Brunholf Baade, East Germany, see: OKB-1 and VEB)
 Baade 152

BAaer

(BA-Aeroplanos, Buenos Aires, Argentina)
BAaer Guri

Babcock 

 Babcock 1905 Wright Flyer copy
 Babcock 1909 Wright Flyer copy
 Babcock 1910 Monoplane
 Babcock 1913 Curtiss Pusher Copy
 Babcock 1916 Biplane
 Babcock LC-7
 Babcock LC-11 Cadet
 Babcock LC-13
 Babcock-Vlchek X Airmaster
 Babcock Ranger
 Babcock Series 1
 Babcock Teal

BAC

see:British Aircraft Company

BAC

see:British Aircraft Corporation

Back Bone

(Tallard, France)
Back Bone Seraph
Back Bone Shadow
Back Bone Silver

Bach

(Bach Aircraft Co, Clover Field, Santa Monica, CA /  Morton L. Bach)
 Bach 3-CT Air Yacht
 Bach Air Yacht
 Bach CS-1
 Bach CS-4
 Bach Polar Bear
 Bach Super Transport
 Bach T-11-P

Bachem 

(Erich Bachem / Bachem-Werke)
 Bachem Lerche
 Bachem Ba 349 Natter
 Ba BP 20 - (Manned Flak Rocket) First versions of Ba-349, some Non-VTO fitted with fixed landing gear and solid nose for flight testing

Backcountry Super Cubs

(Backcountry Super Cubs, LLC, Douglas, WY)
Backcountry Super Cubs Mackey SQ2
Backcountry Super Cubs Supercruiser
Backcountry Super Cubs Super Cub

Backstrom 

(Al Backstrom, Fort Worth, TX)
 Backstrom WPB-1
 Backstrom EPB-1 Flying Plank
 Backstrom Flying Plank II

Bacon
(Erle L. Bacon Corporation)
 Bacon Super T-6

Badez-Giraud-Mercier 

 Badez-Giraud-Mercier Bagimer

BAe 

see:British Aerospace

BAE Systems 

 BAE Systems HERTI
 BAE Systems Fury
 BAE Systems Nimrod MRA4
 BAE Systems Hawk
 BAE Systems Ampersand
 BAE Systems Mantis
 BAE Systems Taranis
 BAE Systems Demon
 BAE Systems PHASA-35

Baco 

(Bethlehem Aircraft Corp, Bethlehem, PA)
 Baco Skylark

BAG

(Bahnbedarf AG, Darmstadt)
 BAG D.I (Akaflieg Darmstadt D-8)
 BAG D.II
 BAG E.I
 BAG E.II

Bagg 

(Roy Raymond Bagg, Mooreton, ND)
 Bagg Model 1

Bagalini 

(Marino Bagalini)
 Bagalini Baga 68
 Bagalini Bagaliante
 Bagalini Bagalini
 Bagalini Baganfibio
 Bagalini Colombo

Bahl 

((Brooks B) Harding, (A D) Zook & (Errold G) Bahl, Lincoln, NE)
 Bahl Lark Monoplane

Bailey 

(Charles Bailey, Madison, NC)
 Bailey The Thing

Bailey 

(Dick Bailey)
 Bailey Model B Bitty Bipe

Bailey Aviation

(Bassingbourn, Royston, United Kingdom)
Bailey JPX D330
Bailey Solo
Bailey V5 paramotor

Bailey & Gray 

(John & Ross Bailey and Marsh Gray, Kingston, NC)
 Bailey & Gray 1911 Monoplane

Baja California 

(designer - Lascurain Y Osio)
 BAJA California BC.1
 BAJA California BC.2
 BAJA California BC.3

Bakeng

(Gerald Bakeng, Edmonds, WA)
 Bakeng Duce
 Bakeng Double Duce

Baker 

(Al and Ray Baker, Kansas City, MO)
 Baker Pete
 Baker Special
 Shannon-Buente Special

Baker 

(Bobby Baker)
 Baker Supercat
 Baker Bobcat

Baker 

(Gil Baker)
 Baker BCA-1 Amphibian

Baker 

(Baker Air Research, Huron, OH)
 Baker Aquarius
 Baker MB-1 Delta Kitten
 Baker Boo Ray

Baker 

(Art Baker, Kansas City, MO)
 Baker B-2

Baker-Scott 

(Clyde Baker & Tommy Scott, Bartlett Tennessee, US)
 Baker-Scott A

Bal-Aire 

(Ballard Leins, Tinley Park, IL)
 Bal-Aire BA

Baldwin 

(Baldwin Aeroplanes)
 Baldwin Red Devil

Baldwin 

((Gary) Baldwin Aircraft Intl.)
 Baldwin ASP-XJ
 Baldwin ASP-XJS

Ball 

(Clifford Ball, Bettis Field, McKeesport, PA)
 Ball S-T

Ballard Sport Aircraft

(Ballard Sport Aircraft, Limited, Sherbrooke, Quebec)
Ballard Pelican

Ball-Bartoe

(Ball-Bartoe Aircraft Corp, Boulder, CO)
 Ball-Bartoe JW-1 Jetwing

Ballou-Whitehair 

((W J) Ballou-(Walter L) Whitehair Aeroplane Co, Portland, OR)
 Ballou-Whitehair 1929 Aircraft

Bally 

(Jack Bally & Don Smith)
 Bally B-17

Baltrun 

((Joseph) Baltrun Flying Service, Springfield, MA)
 Baltrun 1930 Biplane

Bancroft 

((Basil or Louis) Bancroft Airplane Co, E Hartford, CT)
 Bancroft 1917 Biplane

Bánhidi

(Antal Bánhidi)
 Bánhidi Gerle

Bánhidi-Lampich

(Antal Bánhidi and Arpad Lampich)
 Bánhidi-Lampich BL-5
 Bánhidi-Lampich BL-6
 Bánhidi-Lampich BL-7 (BL-5 Redesigned by Rubik and Pap)
 Bánhidi-Lampich BL-16

Bannick 

((Lester) Bannick Copter Co, Phoenix, AZ)
 Bannick Model C Copter
 Bannick Model VW Copter
 Bannick Model T of the Air

Barbaro

(René Barbaro) Data from:''' 
 Barbaro RB-10
 Barbaro RB-20
 Barbaro RB-30 (F-WFOT)
 Barbaro RB-40 (F-WFOT)?
 Barbaro RB-50
 Barbaro RB-51
 Barbaro RB-60 (F-PPZG)
 Barbaro RB-70 twin (F-PTEL)
 Barbaro-Gagnant BG.10
 Chagnes-Barbaro CG.10

Barber

(Bill Barber)
 Barber Snark

 Barbette 

(Roland Barbette & Jacky Dessendre)
 Barette AL/BARDE Ruty (Avion Léger/BARbette-DEssendre)

Barcala-Cierva-Diaz

(Sociedad Industrial de Construcciones Aeronauticas Llamada Barcala-Cierva-Diaz)-(Jose Barcala - Juan de la Cierva - Pablo Diaz)
 Barcala-Cierva-Diaz BCD1  El Cangrejo (The Crab)
 Barcala-Cierva-Diaz BCD2
 Barcala-Cierva-Díaz BCD3

Bárcenas
(Aeroservicio Bárcenas S.A)
 Bárcenas B-01

 Barclay 

(Irwin R Barclay, Bloomington, IN)
 Barclay 1933 Monoplane

Barillon

(Pierre Barillon)
 Barillon 1909 Monoplane

Baritsky

 Baritsky Gyroplane A

 Barker 

(Art Barker, Kansas City, MO)
 Barker B-2

 Barker-Bowser 

(Gailard Barker & Kenneth Bowser, Phoenix, AZ)
 Barker-Bowser B-1 Midniter

Barkhoff

 Barkhoff Retractable Wing (Con Ellingston Special)

 Barkley-Grow 

 Barkley-Grow T8P-1

 Barkley-Warwick 

((Archibald S) Barkley &  Warwick Aircraft Corp, 7490 Melville St, Detroit, MI)
 Barkley-Warwick BW-1

Barlatier

(Henri Blanc et Emile Barlatier)
Barlatier et Blanc 1908 monoplane

 Barling 

(Barling Aircraft Co, 526 North 2nd St, St Joseph, MO)
 Barling A
 Barling B-6
 Barling XNBL-1 Bomber

 Barlow
(Carl O. Barlow / Option Air Reno)
 Barlow Acapella 100

 Barnard 

(Barnard Aircraft Corp, Syracuse, US)
 New Strandard D-31

 Barnes 

(S H Barnes, Escalon CA. 19??: 110 N Cypress St, Burbank, CA)
 Barnes BGX-1

Barnett

( (K J) Barnett Rotorcraft Co, Olivehurst, CA)
 Barnett J3M
 Barnett J4M
 Barnett J4B

 Barney 

(Barney Snyder, 3706 49 St, San Diego, CA)
 Barney S-1
 Barney Sportster
 Barney Wren

 Barnhart 

((G Edward) Barnhart, San Diego CA. 1922: Barnhart Aircraft Inc, 44 W Green St, Pasadena, CA)
 Barnhart 1916 Biplane
 Barnhart Twin 15 Wampus Kat (1921) twin-engine biplane transport

 Barr 

(Jim Barr / Barr Aircraft, Williamsport, PA)
 Barrsix

 Barrett 

(Barrett Aircraft Corp, Anoka, MN)
 Barrett Gyracar

 Barrett 

(Barrett Aircraft, 2442 Santa Monica Blvd, Santa Monica, CA)
 Barrett 1931 Monoplane

Barritault 

(Jean Barritault)
 Barritault JB.01

 Barritt 

(John E Barritt, Riverside CA, later Berkeley, CA)
 Barritt BM-1

 Barrón 

(Eduardo Barrón)
 Barrón España
 Barrón Flecha
 Barrón W
 Barrón Delta
 Barrón Triplano

 Barrows 

(Robert Barrows, Virginia)
 Barrows Grasshopper
 Barrows Bearhawk
 Bearhawk Companion
 Barrows Bearhawk Patrol
 Bearhawk LSA

 Barry 

(Howard S Barry, Birmingham, Alabama, AL)
 Barry Sport

Bartel

 Bartel 1918 monoplane
 Bartel BM 1
 Bartel BM 2
 Bartel BM 4
 Bartel BM 5
 Bartel BM 6

 Bartini 

(Robert Ludvigovich Bartini)
 Bartini A-57
 (Bartini) Beriev Be-1
 Bartini DAR
 Bartini Stal-6
 Bartini Stal-7
 Bartini Stal-8
 Bartini T-108
 Bartini T-117
 Bartini T-200
 Bartini Beriev VVA-14
 Bartini 14M1P

Bartlett
(Bartlett Aircraft Corp.)
 Bartlett Zephyr

 Bartok 

(Frank Bartok, Dillonvale, OH)
 Bartok KA-32

 Barton 

(Wayne F Barton, Northglenn, CO)
 Barton Sylkie One, also known as the Barton Model B-1

 Basler 

 Basler BT-67
 Basler Turbo 37

Bassan-Gué
 Bassan-Gué BN4 night bomber

Bassou

(André Bassou) (see also Societe de Constructions et d'Aviation Legere - SCAL)
 Bassou FB.20 Rubis
 Bassou FB.31 Rubis
 Bassou FB.41
 Bassou Sport

 Bastet 

(Raymond Bastet)
 Bastet 01

 Bastianelli 

(Bastianelli brothers see also Societá Industriale l'Aviazone)
 Bastianelli P.R.B.

Bastier

 Biplan Bastier 1912

 B.A.T. 

(British Aerial Transport Company Limited)
 BAT F.K.20
 BAT F.K.21
 BAT F.K.22
 BAT F.K.23 Bantam
 BAT F.K.24 Baboon
 BAT F.K.25 Basilisk
 BAT F.K.26
 BAT F.K.27
 BAT F.K.28 Crow

 Bat 

(Noran Aircraft Co Ltd (founders: Robert E McGill & L M Finch), 157 10th St, San Francisco, CA)
 Bat P-1
 Bat P-2

 Bates 

((Carl) Bates Aeroplane Co, Chicago IL. 1912: Acquired by Heath Aircraft Co, Chicago, IL)
 Bates 1908 Biplane I
 Bates 1908 Biplane II
 Bates 1911 Monoplane

 Batson 

(Matthew Arlington Batson, Union County, IL 1912: Batson Air Navigation Co, Savannah, GA)
 Batson Air Yacht
 Batson Dragonfly

Battaille

 Battaille Triplane

 Batwing 

(Batwing Aircraft Co. (fdr: Walter F McGinty), Alameda, CA)
 Batwing X-1

Bauer
 Bauer Bz 1
 Bauer Bz 2

Bauer Avion

(Prague, Czech Republic)
Bauer BAD-12 Gyrotrainer

 Bauer-Hueber 

(J Carl Bauer & Lewis Hueber)
 Bauer-Hueber 1936 Monoplane

 Baumann 

(Jack B) Baumann Aircraft Corp, Knoxville, TN
 Baumann B-65
 Baumann B-90
 Baumann B-100
 Baumann B-120
 Baumann BT-120
 Baumann B-250
 Baumann B-290 Brigadier
 Baumann B-360 Brigadier
 Baumann B-480 Super Brigadier
 Custer CCW-5

 Bäumer 

(Bäumer Aero GmbH)
 Bäumer B I Roter Vogel
 Bäumer B II Sausewind
 Bäumer B III Alsterkind
 Bäumer B IV Sausewind
 Bäumer B V Puck
 Bäumer B VI Libelle
 Bäumer B VII

 Baumgärtl 

(Paul Baumgärtl)
 Baumgärtl Heliofly I
 Baumgärtl Heliofly III/57
 Baumgärtl Heliofly III/59
 Baumgärtl PB-60
 Baumgärtl PB-63
 Baumgärtl PB-64

 Baumhauer

(Albert Gillis von Baumhauer)
 Baumhauer helicopter

Baumuster

(Flugzeugbaus Wagener & Hamburg-Flughafen)
 Baumuster HW 4a

 Bay 

(Bay Aviation)
 Bay Super "V" Bonanza

Bayerische Flugzeugwerke AG
see BFW

BDC Aero

(BDC Aero Industrie (aka Puma Aircraft), Lachute, Quebec, Canada)
BDC Aero Puma

 BDM 

 BDM 01

 Beach 

(Irl Simeon Beach, 241 E Douglas Ave, Wichita, KS)
 Beach B-5

 Beach-Whitehead 

(Stanley Y Beach & Gustave Whitehead, Bridgeport, CT; Scientific Aeroplane Co, 125 E 23rd St, New York, NY)
 Beach-Whitehead Gyroscopic Biplane

 Beach-Willard 

(Stanley Y Beach & Charles F Willard, New York)
 Beach-Willard 1909 Monoplane

 Beachey 

(Lincoln Beachey)
 Beachey Little Looper
 Beachey-Curtiss Looper
 Beachey-Curtiss Tractor
 Beachey-Eaton 1915 Monoplane
 Beachey-Stupar 1914 Biplane

 Beachner 

(Chris Beachner, Tucson AZ. Mizell Enterprises (after Beachner's death), Brighton CO.)
 Beachner V-8 Special

 Beagle 

 Beagle A.61 Terrier
 Beagle A.113 Husky
 Beagle A.115 A.O.P. Mk.III 
 Beagle B.109 Airedale
 Beagle B.121 Pup
 Beagle B.206
 Beagle B.206R Basset CC.1
 Beagle M.218
 Beagle M.242
 Beagle D.4/108
 Beagle D.5/180
 Beagle D.6/180

 Beal 

(Ralph Beal, Kansas City, MO)
 Beal BM-3
 Beal BP-2
 Beal CM-4
 Century Centurion
 Century SMB-4

 Bealine 

(Bealine Flying Service (pres: Thomas W Beal), Humble, TX)
 Bealine Sporty

 Beard 

(Otis & Louis Beard, St Petersburg, FL)
 Beard Model B

 Beardmore 

 Beardmore Inflexible (Rohrbach Ro VI)
 Beardmore W.B.I
 Beardmore W.B.Ia
 Beardmore W.B.II
 Beardmore W.B.IIa Adriatic
 Beardmore W.B.IIb
 Beardmore W.B.III
 Beardmore W.B.IV
 Beardmore W.B.V
 Beardmore W.B.VI
 Beardmore W.B.VIII
 Beardmore W.B.IX flying boat project
 Beardmore W.B.XXIV Wee Bee
 Beardmore W.B.XXV fighter project
 Beardmore W.B.XXVI
 Beardmore BeRo.2 Inverness (Rohrbach Ro IV)

 Bearhawk
(Bearhawk Aircraft)
 Bearhawk 4-Place
 Bearhawk 5
 Bearhawk Patrol
 Bearhawk Companion
 Bearhawk LSA

Beattie-Fellers

(Ronald Beattie & Walter Fellers)
 Beattie-Fellers S-1

 Beatty 

(George W Beatty / Beatty Aviation Company)
 Beatty-Wright 1911 Biplane
 Beatty 1916 biplane

Beaujon

(Beaujon Aircraft, Ardmore, OK)
Beaujon BJ-2
Beaujon Enduro
Beaujon Flybike
Beaujon Hardnose
Beaujon Mach .07
Beaujon Minimac
Beaujon Viewmaster
Beaujon Windward

 Beaumont 

(Roland W Beaumont, Buffalo, NY)
 Beaumont 1934 Monoplane

Beauregard

Beauregard RB-01

 Béchereau 

(Louis Béchereau / Societe et Ateliers Béchereau)
 Béchereau SAB C.1 (Béchereau, Louis Blériot and Adolphe Bernard, supported by Marc Birkigt)
 Béchereau SRAP T.7

 Becker 

(Arthur H Becker, Brocton, NY)
 Becker BS-4

 Beckner 

(F W Beckner, Victoria, TX)
 Beckner FW-1
 Beckner FW-2

 Beco 

((Harvey) Beilgard Co, Beverly Hills, CA)
 Beco B-1
 Beco B-5
 Beco-Brown L-5

Bede

(Bede Aviation Inc, Chesterfield, MO)
 Bede BD-1
 Bede XBD-2
 Bede BD-2
 Bede BD-3
 Bede BD-4
 Bede BD-5
 Bede BD-6
 Bede BD-7
 Bede BD-8
 Bede BD-9
 Bede BD-10
 Bede BD-11
 Bede BD-12
 Bede BD-14
 Bede BD-16
 Bede BD-17
 Bede BD-18
 Bede BD-22L

Bedek

(Bedek Aviation)
 Bedek B-101

 Bee Line 

(Harry T Booth & Arthur L "Mike" Thurston)
 Bee line Booth Racer
 Bee Line Thurston Racer

 Beebe 

(Beebe Aircraft Service Inc.)
 Beebe 1928 Monoplane

 Beebe 

(Henry J Beebe, Scienceville, OH)
 Beebe 1937 Monoplane

 Beechcraft 
(Beech Aircraft Corp. (founders: Walter Beech, Olive Ann Beech), Wichita, KS)

 Beechcraft Model 16
 Beech Model 17 Staggerwing
 Beech Model 18 Twin Beech
 Beech Model 19 Musketeer
 Beech Model 23 Musketeer and Sundowner
 Beech Model 24 Sierra
 Beech Model 33 Debonair
 Beech Model 34 Twin-Quad
 Beech Model 35 Bonanza
 Beech Model 36 Bonanza
 Beech Model 38P Lightning
 Beech Model 45
 Beech Model 50 Twin Bonanza
 Beech Model 55 Baron
 Beech Model 56 Baron
 Beech Model 58 Baron
 Beech Model 60 Duke
 Beech Model 65 Queen Air
 Beech Model 70 Queen Airliner
 Beech Model 73 Jet Mentor
 Beech Model 76 Duchess
 Beech Model 77 Skipper
 Beech Model 80 Queen Air
 Beech Model 88 Queen Air
 Beech Model 90 King Air
 Beech Model 95 Travel Air
 Beech Model 99 Airliner
 Beech Model 100 King Air
 Beech Model 200 King Air
 Beech Model 300 King Air
 Beech Model 350 Super King Air
 Beech King Air 350i
 Beech Model 400 Beechjet
 Beech Model 1300 Airliner
 Beech Model 1900 Airliner
 Beech Model 2000 Starship
 Beech A-38 Grizzly
 Beech AT-6B Wolverine
 Beech AT-7 Navigator
 Beech AT-10 Wichita
 Beech AT-11 Kansan
 Beech C-6 Ute
 Beech C-12 Huron
 Beech C-43 Traveler
 Beech C-45 Expeditor
 Beech CT-128 Expeditor Canadian Armed Forces
 Beech CT-134 Musketeer Canadian Armed Forces
 Beech CT-145 Super King Air Canadian Armed Forces
 Beech CQ-3
 Beech F-2
 Beech GB
 Beech JB
 Beech JRB
 Beech L-23 Seminole
 Beech SNB
 Beech T-1A Jayhawk
 Beech T-6 Texan II
 Beech T-34 Mentor
 Beech T-36
 Beech T-42 Cochise
 Beech T-44 Pegasus
 Beech U-8 Seminole
 Beech U-21 Ute
 Beech U-22
 Beech PD-249
 Beech QA-65

 Beecraft 

(Bee Aviation Associates)
 Beecraft Queen Bee
 Beecraft Honeybee
 Beecraft Wee Bee

Beese-Boutard

(Melli Beese and Charles Boutard)
 Beese-Boutard Flugboot

Beets

(Glenn Beets, Riverside, CA)
 Beets GB-1 Special

 Beidenmeister 

(Karl A Beidenmeister, Indianapolis, IN)
 Beidenmeister 1925 Biplane

Beijing Aviation Institute

 Beijing-1

 Beijing Aviation Polytechnic School 

 Hongqi-1

 Belcher 

((Osmond Theron) Belcher Aerial Mfg Co, Los Angeles, CA)
 Belcher B.T.1 Airliner California Bel Geddes 

(Norman Bel Geddes, New York, NY)
 Bel Geddes Air Liner#4

 Bélin 

(Henri Bélin)
 Bélin Zéphir

 Belite 

(Belite Aircraft)
 Belite Ultra Cub
 Belite Aircraft 254
 Belite Aircraft Superlite
 Belite Aircraft Trike

Bell

(Fred Bell)
Bell Sidewinder

 Bell 

(Oscar Perry Bell, Atchison, KS)
 Bell B

 Bell 

(John Robert Bell, Belle Vernon, PA)
 Bell LM

 Bell 

 Bell 1914 Biplane
 Bell 1
 Bell 2
 Bell 3
 Bell 7
 Bell 8
 Bell 11
 Bell 12
 Bell 13
 Bell 15
 Bell 16
 Bell 17
 Bell 23
 Bell 26
 Bell 27
 Bell 29
 Bell 30
 Bell 32
 Bell 33
 Bell 34
 Bell 37
 Bell 38
 Bell 40
 Bell 41
 Bell 42
 Bell 43
 Bell 44
 Bell 45
 Bell 47
 Bell 48
 Bell 52
 Bell 54
 Bell 58
 Bell 59
 Bell 60
 Bell 61
 Bell 65 ATV
 Bell 68
 Bell 201
 Bell 204
 Bell 205
 Bell 206 Jetranger
 Bell 207 Sioux Scout
 Bell 208
 Bell 209
 Bell 211
 Bell 212
 Bell 214
 Bell 214ST
 Bell 222
 Bell 230
 Bell 249
 Bell 255
 Bell 301
 Bell 309
 Bell 360 Invictus
 Bell 400 Twin Ranger
 Bell 406
 Bell 407
 Bell 409
 Bell 412
 Bell 427
 Bell 429
 Bell 430
 Bell 440 Twin Ranger
 Bell 525 Relentless
 Bell 533
 Bell FCX-001
 Bell A-7 Airacobra
 Bell XF-109
 Bell YFM-1 Airacuda
 Bell AH-1 Cobra
 Bell AH-1 SuperCobra
 Bell AH-1Z Viper
 Bell UH-1 Iroquois
 Bell UH-1Y Venom
 Bell UH-1N Twin Huey
 Bell H-4 Kiowa
 Bell H-13 Sioux
 Bell H-15
 Bell H-33
 Bell H-40
 Bell H-57 Sea Ranger
 Bell OH-58 Warrior Armed Observation Helicopter
 Bell OH-58 Kiowa
 Bell YAH-63
 Bell H-67 Creek
 Bell ARH-70
 Bell HO-4
 Bell HU-1
 Bell P-39 Airacobra
 Bell XP-45
 Bell XP-52
 Bell P-59 Airacomet
 Bell P-63 Kingcobra
 Bell XP-76
 Bell XP-77
 Bell XP-83
 Bell R-12
 Bell R-13
 Bell R-15
 Bell XV-3 Convertiplane
 Bell XV-15
 Bell X-1
 Bell X-2
 Bell X-5
 Bell X-14
 Bell X-16
 Bell X-22
 Bell XS-1
 Bell XS-2
 Bell XS-5
 Bell FL Airabonita
 Bell F2L Airabonita
 Bell XF3L
 Bell HSL
 Bell HTL
 Bell HUL

 LLRV
 Bell Eagle Eye
 Bell Co-axial Rotor Helicopter
 Bell D-292 ACAP
 Bell L-39
 Bell P-400
 Bell CH-118 Iroquois Canadian Armed Forces
 Bell CH-135 Twin Huey Canadian Armed Forces
 Bell CH-136 Kiowa Canadian Armed Forces
 Bell CH-139 Jet Ranger Canadian Armed Forces
 Bell CH-146 Griffon Canadian Armed Forces
 Bell D-188A

Bell-Agusta

 Bell/Agusta BA609

Bell-Boeing Vertol

 Bell-Boeing Vertol V-22 Osprey

Bellamy-Hillbourne

 BH.1 Halcyon

 Bellanca 
(AviaBellanca Aircraft Corporation / Giuseppe Mario Bellanca)

 Bellanca 1911 monoplane 
 Bellanca 1923 6-seat biplane
 Bellanca 1923 2-seat biplane
 Bellanca 1924 monoplane
 Bellanca 2-12 - Class KD Target Drone. NASM archives.
 Bellanca 11 Trainer
 Bellanca 14-7 Cruisair Junior
 Bellanca 14-9 Cruisair Junior
 Bellanca 14-10L
 Bellanca 14-12 Cruisair
 Bellanca 14-13
 Bellanca 14-19 Cruisemaster
 Bellanca 14-19A Bravo
 Bellanca 17-20
 Bellanca 17-30 Viking
 Bellanca 17-110 Interceptor - Allison V-1710-33 (1939). NASM archives.
 Bellanca 18-13 - NASM archives.
 Bellanca 18-40 - NASM archives.
 Bellanca 19-25 Skyrocket II
 Bellanca 19-18 - "Important Technical Information." NASM archives.
 Bellanca 19-67 - NASM archives.
 Bellanca 20-115 Pursuit, Turbo Supercharger - (1939). NASM archives.
 Bellanca 22-80 (Alternate) - "VF Proposal Biplane" (1935). NASM archives
 Bellanca 23-55 - NASM archives.
 Bellanca 23-80 - "VF High Wing" (1935). NASM archives.
 Bellanca 24-45 - NASM archives.
 Bellanca 27-50 - NASM archives.
 Bellanca 28-70 Flash
 Bellanca 28-90 Flash
 Bellanca 28-90B
 Bellanca 28-92
 Bellanca 28-100 - NASM archives.
 Bellanca 28-110
 Bellanca 28-140 - NASM archives.
 Bellanca 30-42 Special
 Bellanca 31-40 Pacemaker Senior
 Bellanca 31-42 Pacemaker Senior
 Bellanca 31-50
 Bellanca 31-55 Skyrocket Senior
 Bellanca 33-220 Twin Engine Pursuit - (1939) NASM archives.
 Bellanca 49-42 Liaison Short Range Observation - NASM archives.
 Bellanca 50-210 Trimotor Bomber - NASM archives.
 Bellanca 65-75 - "Group Weight Statement, From Actual Weights of Bellanca C-27B." NASM archives.
 Bellanca 66-67 Aircruiser
 Bellanca 66-70
 Bellanca 66-75 Aircruiser
 Bellanca 66-76 Aircruiser
 Bellanca 66-85 Aircruiser 
 Bellanca 66-87 Patrol Utility Airplane, Class VPJ - (1939). NASM archives.
 Bellanca 66-90 Patrol Utility Airplane - NASM archives.
 Bellanca 77-140
 Bellanca 77-320 Junior
 Bellanca 77-160
 Bellanca 77-170
 Bellanca Air Sedan
 Bellanca Airbus
 Bellanca Aircruiser
 Bellanca Aries
 Bellanca Aries T-250
 Bellanca Champion
 Bellanca Champion 115
 Bellanca Decathlon
 Bellanca Decathlon CS
 Bellanca Standard
 Bellanca Standard II
 Bellanca Citabria
 Bellanca Citabria Aurora
 Bellanca Cruisair
 Bellanca Cruisair Junior
 Bellanca Cruisemaster
 Bellanca Pacemaker
 Bellanca Scout
 Bellanca Sport
 Bellanca Standard
 Bellanca Standard II
 Bellanca Super Decathlon
 Bellanca Tandem a.k.a. Blue Streak Bellanca Tradewind Special
 Bellanca Viking
 Bellanca Super Viking
 Bellanca Turbo Super Viking
 Bellanca 7ACA
 Bellanca 7ECA
 Bellanca 7GCAA
 Bellanca 7GCAB
 Bellanca 7GCBC Scout
 Bellanca 7KCAB
 Bellanca 7GCAA
 Bellanca 7GCAB
 Bellanca 8GCBC Scout
 Bellanca 8KCAB
 Bellanca 150
 Bellanca - Twin Float Monoplane (1935). NASM archives.
 Bellanca 115-200 NASM archives.
 Bellanca 260 SEE 14–19.
 Bellanca 300-W Pacemaker
 Bellanca C-24-100-P - NASM archives.
 Bellanca C-28-140 - NASM archives.
 Bellanca CD
 Bellanca CE
 Bellanca CF
 Bellanca CG - "Preliminary Figures given to Wright in 1925." NASM archives.
 Bellanca CH-200 Pacemaker
 Bellanca CH-300 Pacemaker
 Bellanca CH-300-W Pacemaker
 Bellanca CH-400 Skyrocket
 Bellanca D Skyrocket de Havilland DH-4 Modified - NASM archives.
 Bellanca E Pacemaker 1932
 Bellanca F Skyrocket
 Bellanca J
 Bellanca J-300
 Bellanca J-2 Pacemaker
 Bellanca J2 Tradewind Special
 Bellanca JE 1938
 Bellanca K 1928
 Bellanca KD-300 - NASM archives.
 Bellanca M Transport - NASM archives.
 Bellanca MP-901 Canadian Mailplane - NASM archives.
 Bellanca P
 Bellanca P-100 Airbus
 Bellanca P-200
 Bellanca P-200-A Airbus
 Bellanca P-300 Airbus
 Bellanca PM-300 Pacemaker Freighter
 Bellanca SE Sport (CF)
 Bellanca T-14-14
 Bellanca T-14-15 Trainer - (1948). NASM archives.
 Bellanca TES Tandem aka Blue Streak Bellanca C-27
 Bellanca L-11
 Bellanca SOE
 Bellanca SE
 Bellanca RE
 Bellanca P-2 "Army" - NASM archives.
 Bellanca O-50 (Model 49-42)
 Bellanca YO-50
 Bellanca VF NASM archives.
 Bellanca XC-942 NASM archives.
 Bellanca XPTBH-2 NASM archives.

 Bellanca 

(Bellanca Aircraft Engineering Inc.)
 Bellanca Model 25 Skyrocket

Bellanger

(Bellanger Freres)
 Bellanger-Denhaut 22

 Bellotti 

(Anthony Bellotti, New Bedford, MA)
 Bellotti Sport

 Belohlavek 

(John (or Joe) Belohlavek Jr, Sierra Madre, CA)
 Belohlavek M-2

 Beltrame 

(Quinto Beltrame)
 Beltrame Colibri

 Beltran 

(Christian Beltran)
 Beltran SNJ Corsair

Belworthy

 Belworthy BEL-7 Figaro

 Belyayev 
(Viktor Nikolayevich Belyayev)
 Belyayev DB-LK
 Belyayev Babochka
 Belyayev EI
 Belyayev EOI
 Belyayev PI
 Belyayev PBI
 Belyayev BP-3

Ben Showers

(Showers-Aero, Milton, PA)
 Ben Showers Skytwister

 Bendix 

((Vincent) Bendix Products Corp, 401 Bendix Dr, South Bend IN. 1944: Bendix Personal Airplane Div, Detroit MI.)
 Bendix 51
 Bendix 51A
 Bendix 52
 Bendix 55
 Bendix B-S-1
 Bendix Controlwing

 Bendix 

(Bendix Helicopters Inc.)
 Bendix Model J
 Bendix model K

Beneš-Mráz

(Beneš & Mráz Továrna na Letadla)
Beneš-Mráz Be-50 Beta-Minor (trainer, 1935, serie)
Beneš-Mráz Be-51 Beta-Minor (1937, Serie)
Beneš-Mráz Be-52 Beta-Major (1936)
Beneš-Mráz Be-53 
Beneš-Mráz Be-56 (1936)
Beneš-Mráz Be-60 Bestiola (1935, Serie)
Beneš-Mráz Be-150 Beta-Junior (1936, Serie)
Beneš-Mráz Be-156 (1935)
Beneš-Mráz Be-250 Beta Major (1936, Serie)
Beneš-Mráz Be-251 (1938)
Beneš-Mráz Be-252 Beta-Scolar ( 1937)
Beneš-Mráz Be-352(1939, Projekt)
Beneš-Mráz Be-501
Beneš-Mráz Be-502
Beneš-Mráz Be-550 Bibi  (1936, Serie)
Beneš-Mráz Be-555 Super Bibi (1938, Serie)
Mráz K-65 Čáp Fieseler Fi156 copy
Mráz M-2 Skaut (1948)

 Bengston 

 Bengston Fliverette

 Benner 

(Reno Benner, Leavittwon PA.)
 Benner Special

 Bennett 

(Bennett Aviation / Bennett Aircraft Co) 
 Bennett PL-11 Airtruk

 Bennett 

((Frank) Bennett Aircraft Co, Fort Worth, TX, 1942: Reorganized as Globe Aircraft Co., a.k.a. Breese-Bennett)
 Bennett BTC-1

 Bennett 

(George Bennett, Kansas City, MO)
 Bennett Airliner

 Bennett 

(Grover Bennett & Son, Keosauqua, IA)
 Bennett Seraph

 Bennett 

(S C Bennett, Bridgewater NC.)
 Bennett 1928 Monoplane

 Bennett-Christofferson 

( (Fred A) Bennett-(Silas) Christofferson Airship Co, Portland, OR)
 Bennett-Christofferson 1910 Biplane

 Benoist 

(Benoist Aircraft Co,)
 Benoist 1910/1911 Biplane "Benoist Headless"
 Benoist 1912 Biplane
 Benoist 1912 Covered Fuselage Biplane
 Benoist 1912 Tractor Hydro
 Benoist C
 Benoist E
 Benoist Land Tractor Type XII
 Benoist XIII
 Benoist XIV
 Benoist XV
 Benoist XVII

 Bensen 

((Dr Igor B) Bensen Aircraft Corp. Raleigh, NC)
 Bensen B-3 "Bensen-General Electric B-3"
 Bensen B-4 Sky Scooter
 Bensen B-5
 Bensen B-6
 Bensen B-7 Gyro-Glider
 Bensen B-7B Gyro-boat
 Bensen B-7M Gyro-Copter
 Bensen B-7W Hydro-Glider
 Bensen B-8 Gyro-Copter
 Bensen B-8 Gyro-Glider
 Bensen B-8W Hydro-Glider
 Bensen B-9 Little Zipster
 Bensen B-10 Prop-Copter
 Bensen B-11 Gyro-Copter
 Bensen B-12 Sky-Way
 Bensen B-13
 Bensen B-16
 Bensen B-18 Hover-Gyro
 Bensen B-80
 Bensen Super Gyro-Copter
 Bensen Mid-Jet
 Bensen X-25

 Benson 

(George C Benson, San Bernardino, CA)
 Benson Jon B Special

 Bentley 

(J Frank Bentley, Phoenix, AZ)
 Bentley HB 4-1

 Bentzen 

(William Bentzen, IL)
 Bentzen Sport#1

 Berca 

(Jorge Berca)
 Berca JB-3
 Berca JB-4

 Bereznyak-Isayev 

 Bereznyak-Isayev BI-1

 Berckmans 

((Maurice & Emile) Berckmans Airplane Co, New York)
 Berckmans Speed Scout
 Berckmans B-2
 Berckmans B-3

Berg & Storm

(Berg & Storm / Burmeister & Wain)
 Berg & Storm B&S I
 Berg & Storm B&S II
 Berg & Storm B&S III

 Bergamaschi 

(Cantieri Aeronuatici Bergamaschi / CAB)
 Bergamaschi AR-1
 Bergamaschi AR-2
 Bergamaschi AR-10
 Bergamaschi C-1
 Bergamaschi C-2
 Bergamaschi SC-4
 Bergamaschi SC-5
 Bergamaschi CAB.6
 Bergamaschi CAB.7

Berger

 Berger HB-25
 Berger BX-50
 Berger BX-110
 Berger BX-111
 Berger BX-200
 Berger BX-300

Bergier 

(Henri Bergier)
 Bergier helicopter

 Beriev 

 Beriev LL-143
 Beriev Be-4 also known as Beriev KOR-2 Beriev Be-6 Nato-Code:Madge  Beriev Be-8 Nato-Code:Mole  Beriev Be-10 Nato-Code:Mallow  Beriev Be-12 Tschaika (Seagull) Nato-Code:Mail  Beriev KOR-1
 Beriev KOR-2
 Beriev MBR-2
 Beriev MBR-7
 Beriev MDR-5
 Beriev R-1
 Beriev SA-20P
 Beriev Be-30
 Beriev Be-32
 Beriev Be-42
 Beriev Be-103 Bekas
 Beriev Be-132
 Beriev Be-200
 Beriev Qing-6
 Beriev A-40
 Beriev A-50
 Beriev A-60
 Beriev A-100
 Antonov-Beriev Be-20
 Beriev S-13

 Berk 

(Glenn W Berk, Blissfield, MI)
 Berk GB-1

 Berkeley 

(Berkeley Aviation Services Ltd (Fdr: O A Houfe), Berkeley, CA)
 Berkeley Baby Pursuit

 Berkmans 

 Berkmans Speed Scout

 Berkshire 

(Berkshire Aircraft Co, 91 Brown St, Pittsfield, MA)
 Berkshire Silver Cloud

 Berkut 

(Berkut Engineering)
 Berkut 360
 Berkut VL
 Berkut 540
 Berkut FG540
 Berkut Jet
 Berkut Mobius

Berlin

see:Akaflieg Berlin

 Berliner-Joyce 

 Berliner Basic Trainer
 Berliner CM-3
 Berliner CM-4
 Berliner CM-5
 Berliner CM-6 Dragon
 Berliner CM-9 Flying Boat
 Berliner Model D
 Berliner Model E
 Berliner-Joyce 29-1 Commercial
 Berliner-Joyce CM-4
 Berliner-Joyce FJ
 Berliner-Joyce F2J
 Berliner-Joyce XF3J
 Berliner-Joyce OJ
 Berliner-Joyce P-16
 Berliner-Joyce PB-1

 Berliner Helicopters 

 Berliner 1907 Single-Bladed Helicopter
 Berliner 1907 Twin-Bladed Helicopter
 Berliner 1913 Helicopter
 Berliner Model D helicopter ca.1920
 Berliner Helicopter ca.1921
 Berliner Triplane Helicopter ca.1923
 Berliner Helicoplane ca.1924

 Bernard Etablissements Adolphe Bernard Bernard AB 1
 Bernard AB 2
 Bernard AB 3
 Bernard AB 4Société Industrielle des Métaux et du Bois (S.I.M.B.)
 Bernard SIMB AB 10
 Bernard SIMB AB 12
 Bernard SIMB AB 16
 Bernard SIMB V-1
 Bernard SIMB V-2
 Bernard V.1
 Bernard V.2
 Bernard V-4
 Bernard 1
 Bernard 12
 Bernard 14
 Bernard 15Société des Avions Bernard (S.A.B.)
 Bernard 18
 Bernard 20
 Bernard H.V.40 - single-seat racing seaplane (1931)
 Bernard H.V.41
 Bernard H.V.42 - single-seat racing seaplane (1931)
 Bernard H.52 - single-seat floatplane fighter (1933)
 Bernard 60T
 Bernard 61T
 Bernard 62
 Bernard 70
 Bernard S-72
 Bernard S-73
 Bernard 74
 Bernard 75
 Bernard 80GR
 Bernard 81GR
 Bernard 81 Bn3
 Bernard 82
 Bernard 84GR
 Bernard 86
 Bernard H.110 - single-seat floatplane fighter (1935)
 Bernard H.V.120 - single-seat racing seaplane (1930)
 Bernard 160
 Bernard 190T
 Bernard 191GR
 Bernard 192T
 Bernard 193T
 Bernard 197GR
 Bernard 200T
 Bernard 201T
 Bernard 202T
 Bernard 203T
 Bernard 204T
 Bernard 205T
 Bernard 207T
 Bernard 210T
 Bernard H.V.220 - single-seat racing seaplane (unflown)
 Bernard 260

 Berry 
(Harold O Berry, Anderson IN.)
 Berry H-25
 Berry H-45

 Bert 
(Floyd S Bert, Carnegie PA.)
 Bert BF-2
 Bert BF-3
 Bert BF-4

Bertin
(Léonce Bertin)
 Bertin 1907 helicopter
 Bertin helicoplan
 Bertin-Lieber helicopter
 Bertin 1910 monoplane
 Bertin monoplan 1912

 Besasie 
(Ray Besasie, Milwaukee WI.)
 Besasie 1932 Monoplane

Bessard-Millevoye
(Bessard and Millevoye)
 Bessard-Millevoye Moineau

Bessière
(Gustave Bessière - see: ESTA)

 Besson 
(Société de construction aéronautiques et Navales Marcel Besson'', 5 rue Saint-Denis, Boulogne-sur-Seine, France)
 Besson 1911 Canard monoplan
 Besson H-3
 Besson H-5
 Besson H-6
 Levy-Besson (aka LB)
 Besson MB.11
 Besson MB.12
 Besson MB.26
 Besson MB.29
 Besson MB.30 to HB.4 specification
 Besson MB.35
 Besson MB.36
 Besson MB.41
 Besson MB.411

Best Off 
 Best Off Nynja
 Best Off Sky Ranger
 Best Off Skyranger Vfun
 Best Off Skyranger Vmax
 Best Off Skyranger Swift

Bestetti 
(Bestetti-Nardi)
 Bestetti BN.1 (sometimes Bestetti-Nardi BN.1)

Bessard-Millevoye
 Bessard-Millevoye Moineau

Betts
(Mike Betts)
 Betts Alliance

Beville 
(Steve Beville, Hammond IN.)
 Beville Special

Bezobrasov 
(Aleksander A. Bezobrazov & F.E. Moska)
 Bezobrazov AA triplane

Bezzola 
(Gion Bezzola)
 Bezzola GB-1 Luftibus
 Bezzola GB-2 Retro

References

Further reading

External links

 List of aircraft (B)